Madregilda is a Spanish film directed by Francisco Regueiro and premiered at the San Sebastián International Film Festival in September 1993.

Plot 
Set in Madrid in the 1940s in an old neighbourhood tavern, on every first Friday of the month at nightfall Moor Hauma organizes a unique and secret card game.

Awards

References 

1993 in Spanish cinema
1993 films
1990s Spanish films
Films set in Madrid
Films set in the 1940s